Bombreit is a village in the administrative district of Gmina Prudnik, within Prudnik County, Opole Voivodeship, in south-western Poland, close to the Czech border.

According to Meyers Gazetteer, 8 people lived in Bombreit. Currently the village is uninhabited.

References

Villages in Prudnik County
Former populated places in Poland